Félix O'Neill (c. 1800 – c. 1870) was Mayor of Ponce, Puerto Rico, from 24 July 1854 to August 1856. He was a Spanish military officer with the rank of Coronel.

Mayoral term
He is well remembered for producing, on 20 August 1856, his 20-point edict titled "Disposiciones Acordadas Por la Municipalidad de Esta Villa, que deben observarse en caso de ser invadida esta Poblacion por la epidemia del Colera-morbo" (Dispositions Agreed Upon by the Municipal Government of this Village, to be observed in the event our People are invaded by the Cholera Morbus epidemic). The gastroenteritis cholera had just invaded the town earlier that month.

See also

 List of Puerto Ricans
 List of mayors of Ponce, Puerto Rico

References

Further reading
 Ramon Marin. Las Fiestas Populares de Ponce. Editorial Universidad de Puerto Rico. 1994.

External links
 Guardia Civil española (c. 1898) (Includes military ranks in 1880s Spanish Empire.)

Mayors of Ponce, Puerto Rico
1800s births
1870s deaths
Year of birth uncertain
Year of death uncertain